Geoff Hibbins (13 November 1929 – 10 March 2018) was an Australian rules footballer who played with St Kilda in the Victorian Football League (VFL).

See also
 Australian football at the 1956 Summer Olympics

Notes

External links 

1929 births
2018 deaths
Australian rules footballers from Victoria (Australia)
St Kilda Football Club players
Collegians Football Club players